Kim Wallan (born 1961) is an American politician from Oregon. A Republican, she serves in the Oregon House of Representatives, representing House District 6 in Medford, Oregon. Wallan was first elected in 2018. She is the Minority Whip.

Early life 
Wallan grew up in Klamath Falls, Oregon.

Education 
Wallan earned a Bachelor of Science degree in Political Science from Willamette University. Wallan earned a JD degree in Law from Willamette University College of Law.

Career 
Wallan practiced law at a local law firm in Oregon for four years before choosing to become a stay-at-home mom. During this time she was an active community volunteer, including serving as a 4-H leader for 18 years.

Wallan served on the Medford School Board from 2011 to 2015 and was elected to the Medford City Council in November 2016.

In September 2017, Wallan announced that she would run for the Oregon House of Representatives seat representing District 6 to replace incumbent Representative Sal Esquivel, who chose to retire after serving in the role for 14 years. In the election the following year, she ran unopposed in the Republican primary and later defeated Democratic rival Michelle Blum Atkinson in the general election, securing 54% of the vote.

One of Wallan's key legislative priorities is to work on what she views as a fiscal shortfall the Oregon Public Employees Retirement System. In the 80th Oregon Legislative Assembly, Wallan serves on the Commission On Transparency Oregon Advisory Commission, the House Committee On Economic Development, the House Committee On Education, and the House Committee On Veterans and Emergency Preparedness.

Personal life
Wallan's husband is Jim Wallan. They have three adult children: Sarah, Brett, and Eric. Wallan and her family live in Medford, Oregon.

References

External links
 Campaign website
 Legislative website
 Kim Wallan at ballotpedia.org

Living people
Republican Party members of the Oregon House of Representatives
21st-century American women politicians
21st-century American politicians
Women state legislators in Oregon
Willamette University alumni
People from Klamath Falls, Oregon
School board members in Oregon
20th-century American lawyers
Willamette University College of Law alumni
Politicians from Medford, Oregon
Oregon city council members
Oregon lawyers
1961 births
20th-century American women lawyers
Women city councillors in Oregon